Cristian Bejarano Benítez (born July 25, 1981) is a Mexican former professional boxer who competed from 2001 to 2007. As an amateur, he won bronze medals at the 1999 Pan American Games and 2000 Summer Olympics.

Olympic results
Defeated Gilbert Khunwane (Botswana) 17-5
Defeated Gheorghe Lungu (Romania) 14-11
Defeated Almazbek Raimkulov (Kyrgyzstan) 14-12
Lost to Andriy Kotelnyk (Ukraine) 14-22

Professional career
A year later he made his professional debut.

Bejarano turned pro in 2001 and has won his first 14 bouts against unknowns. He then he edged out former WBC champion Cesar Bazan.

External links
 
 
 
 

1981 births
Olympic boxers of Mexico
Boxers at the 1999 Pan American Games
Boxers at the 2000 Summer Olympics
Light-welterweight boxers
Living people
Olympic bronze medalists for Mexico
Boxers from Chihuahua (state)
Olympic medalists in boxing
Mexican male boxers
Medalists at the 2000 Summer Olympics
Pan American Games bronze medalists for Mexico
Pan American Games medalists in boxing
Medalists at the 1999 Pan American Games
20th-century Mexican people
21st-century Mexican people